Henry Rago (1915–1969) was a poet, educator, and editor.

Overview
Rago was editor of Poetry Magazine for 14 years from 1955-1969. He was also a Professor of Theology and Literature at the University of Chicago jointly in the Divinity School and in the New Collegiate Division. His seminars and research explored the relations between poetry and religion, among other interdisciplinary concerns. He was co-chairman of the program in the History and Philosophy of Religion in the New Collegiate Division.

He died at age 53 on May 26, 1969 in Chicago. Rago had, just that year, resigned his editorship at Poetry to take a year of lecturing and writing on a grant from the Ford Foundation to be followed by a full time position at the University of Chicago. He was at work on a book titled The Vocation of Poetry.

His poems were widely published in magazines and newspapers during his lifetime, beginning at age 16 in Poetry Magazine. His book of poems, A Sky of Late Summer, was published by Macmillan in 1963.

Stanley Kunitz wrote:

Hayden Carruth writes:

He has recorded poems for the archives of the Library of Congress and for the Lamont Library at Harvard among the many places throughout the world he lectured on literature and philosophy, and read his poems.

Henry Rago was married to painter Juliet Rago and had four children.

References

Further reading
Henry Rago, Editor of Poetry Magazine. New York Times, May 28, 1969.
Henry Rago, Chicago Poet, is dead at 53. Chicago Tribune, May 27, 1969.
Issue of Poetry Magazine, dedicated to Henry Rago: 
https://www.poetryfoundation.org/poetrymagazine/issue/71000/november-1969

1915 births
1969 deaths
University of Chicago faculty
20th-century American poets